Elachista teruelensis is a moth of the family Elachistidae that is endemic to Spain.

References

teruelensis
Moths described in 1990
Endemic fauna of Spain
Moths of Europe